Piercefield is a townland in County Westmeath, Ireland. The name Piercefield also applies to the neighbouring townland of Piercefield (or Templeoran).

Piercefield is one of 8 townlands of the civil parish of Portnashangan, in the barony of Corkaree in the Province of Leinster. The neighbouring townlands are: Farrow and  Rathbennett to the north, Grangegeeth and Mountmurray to the east and Piercefield (or Templeoran) to the south.

In the 1911 census of Ireland there were 3 houses and 15 inhabitants in the townland.

References

External links
Map of Piercefield at openstreetmap.org
Piercefield at the IreAtlas Townland Data Base
Piercefield at Townlands.ie
 Piercefield at the Placenames Database of Ireland

Townlands of County Westmeath